Millers Ferry Lock and Dam is a lock and hydroelectric dam on the Alabama River, near the community of Millers Ferry, Alabama. It was built by and continues to be operated by the United States Army Corps of Engineers.  Construction of the complex began in 1963 and was completed in 1974.  The Millers Ferry Powerhouse came on line in 1970 and has a generating capacity of 90 megawatts.  Following a history of machinery problems and failures, major repair work on the power station was authorized in 1996.

Millers Ferry Lock and Dam impounds the William "Bill" Dannelly Reservoir.

Beginning in the spring of 2009, the Corps of Engineers began opening the dam's locks for a few hours each day in order to restore access to inland waters for migratory marine fish. Fish sampling in the lock is being conducted in order to determine which species are making use of the opening in order to refine the timing.

See also

List of Alabama dams and reservoirs

References

Dams in Alabama
Hydroelectric power plants in Alabama
Crossings of the Alabama River
Transportation buildings and structures in Wilcox County, Alabama
United States Army Corps of Engineers dams
Energy infrastructure completed in 1970
Dams completed in 1974
ACT River Basin